The following is a list of trips for politicians, lobbyists, and staffers funded by Jack Abramoff.

The picture at right (taken at Carnoustie) for the trip to St. Andrews, the famed Scottish golf course.  This trip was paid for by Abramoff at a cost of $160,000.  Congressman Bob Ney's then chief of staff, William Heaton, admitted "falsifying his and Ney's financial disclosure forms in 2002 and 2003 to keep gifts secret. For example, Ney's forms said the Scotland trip was paid for by the National Center for Public Policy Research so he could meet with Scottish parliamentarians, though the Scottish Parliament was not in session...."

Trips

References

Sources